Jacques Mauger was born in Normandy and studied the trombone at the " Conservatoire National Supérieur de Musique de Paris ".
A prize-winner at international competitions at Markneukirchen and at Toulon, he started his professional career as first trombone with the Nice Philharmonic Orchestra, and then became trombone soloist with the Paris Opera Orchestra. 
Since 1990, he has concentrated on working as a concert artist, and has often appeared as a soloist and abroad with ensembles varying from string, and symphony orchestras, to brass and concert bands.
He has also made television appearances on ZDF,GLOBO, RAI and MUZZIK in France, and many international composers have composed original works or made special arrangements for him. 
Jacques Mauger is still active as a teacher at the "Conservatoire à Rayonnement Régional de Paris and the trombone Professor HEMU of Lausanne. He has recorded more than 30 CDs as a soloist.

He is also guest professor at the Senzoku Gaquen University of Tokyo, Japan.
He often gives masterclasses in numerous countries: France, the U.K, Japan, Korea, China, Spain, Germany, Switzerland, Holland, the United States, and South America. 

In 2007 his newly developed studies collection for trombone (in collaboration with Jean Michel Defaye) will be published in his collection IMD Arpèges publications Paris.
He also developed the new AC440 trombone model in Antoine Courtois Paris brass factory. 
In his role as a true Ambassador of the French school and its repertoire, he regularly presents masterclasses throughout the world for the soloists of tomorrow. Jacques Mauger is the new president of the “Association des Trombonistes Français” and president of the International Trombone Association since 2020.

Discography 
 Latitudes Trombone - J.C.M.A. 07
 Trombone, Brass Band - 43RI02
 Showcase for Trombone - JCMA Production: jcmasarl@wanadoo.fr
 Virtuoso trombone - KICC 109
 Super Sonic trombone - KICC 191
 Great Trombone concertos - Indésens INDE079
 Trombone Méditation - Indésens INDE029
 Jacques Mauger & Friends - Tutti Records TUTT002
 Baroque Trombone Concerti - Tutti Records TUT005
 Special Trombone et Strombor Brass Quintet - JCMA Production: jcmasarl@wanadoo.fr
 Tour de Slide with Irvin Wagner Oklahoma Trombone Choir
 Tbon & Jacques (Ferran Ferrer, Jean-Michel Defaye, Daniel Bimbi Musique militaire Gran-Ducale) - Indésens INDE116
 Sixty Years of Trombone (Bernsteinn, legrand, Moussorgski) - Indésens INDE140

External links 
 Official website
 Jacques Mauger (Association des trombones de France)
 Discography (Discogs)
 Festival de Trombone d'Alsace 2015-Jacques Mauger plays Ropartz (YouTube)

1959 births
Living people
People from Barentin
Conservatoire de Paris alumni
French classical trombonists
Male trombonists
French music educators
20th-century French musicians
21st-century French musicians
20th-century classical trombonists
21st-century classical trombonists
20th-century French male musicians
21st-century French male musicians